Mount Terror is a large shield volcano that forms the eastern part of Ross Island, Antarctica. It has numerous cinder cones and domes on the flanks of the shield and is mostly under snow and ice. It is the second largest of the four volcanoes that make up Ross Island and is somewhat overshadowed by its neighbour, Mount Erebus,  to the west. Mount Terror was named in 1841 by Sir James Clark Ross for his second ship, HMS Terror. The captain of Terror was Francis Crozier, a close friend of Ross for whom the nearby Cape Crozier is named.

Geography

The rocks at the summit have not been studied, but rocks from the lower areas range from 0.82 to 1.75 million years old, and Mount Terror shows no signs of more recent volcanic activity.

The first ascent of Mt. Terror was made by a New Zealand party in 1959.

Terror Point, located just below Mt. Terror, is the eastern limit of Fog Bay,  WNW of Cape MacKay on Ross Island. The name was first used by members of the British National Antarctic Expedition, 1901–04, and was apparently applied in association with Mt. Terror which overlooks this point from the northeast.

Terror Saddle is one of three prominent snow saddles on Ross Island, located c.1600 m between Mount Terra Nova and Mount Terror. Named in association with Mount Terror, which rises to 3262 m to the east of this saddle.

Terror Glacier is a large glacier between Mount Terra Nova and Mount Terror on Ross Island, flowing south into Windless Bight. So named by A.J. Heine of the New Zealand Geological Survey Antarctic Expedition (NZGSAE), 1962–63, because of its association with Mount Terror.

Cultural references
Mount Terror is the stronghold of Russian anarchist revolutionaries in the 1894 science fiction novel Olga Romanoff by George Griffith.
Mount Terror and Mount Erebus are mentioned in the 1936 novella At the Mountains of Madness by H.P. Lovecraft.
Mount Terror is used as a location in the 2004 novel State of Fear by Michael Crichton.
Mount Terror is referenced in Twenty Thousand Leagues Under The Sea by the narrator Professor Arronax, after they arrive at the South Pole, in reference to two volcanic craters, the Erebus and Terror, in context to an earlier discovery by ‘’James Clark Ross’’.

See also

List of volcanoes in Antarctica
List of Ultras of Antarctica

References

External links

Bibliography
 

Volcanoes of Ross Island
Polygenetic shield volcanoes
Extinct volcanoes
Pleistocene shield volcanoes